Do Kuh or Dokuh may refer to:
 Do Kuh, Hormozgan